Lakes was a census-designated place (CDP) in Matanuska-Susitna Borough, Alaska, United States. It was split in two CDPs for 2020 Census purposes: North Lakes and South Lakes. The area is part of the Anchorage, Alaska Metropolitan Statistical Area. At the 2010 census the population was 8,364, up from 6,706 in 2000.

Geography
Lakes is located at  (61.607440, -149.304056) near Wasilla and Palmer.

There is public access to some of the  lakes for which the CDP is named via the Finger Lakes State Recreation Site.

Demographics

Lakes first appeared on the 2000 U.S. Census as a census-designated place (CDP).

As of the census of 2000, there were 6,706 people, 2,217 households, and 1,775 families residing in the CDP. There were 2,329 housing units at an average density of 170.6/sq mi (65.9/km2). The racial makeup of the CDP was 89.49% White, 0.60% Black or African American, 4.58% Native American, 0.54% Asian, 0.09% Pacific Islander, 0.55% from other races, and 4.16% from two or more races.  1.95% of the population were Hispanic or Latino of any race.

There were 2,217 households, out of which 46.0% had children under the age of 18 living with them, 67.9% were married couples living together, 7.9% had a female householder with no husband present, and 19.9% were non-families. 14.3% of all households were made up of individuals, and 2.8% had someone living alone who was 65 years of age or older.  The average household size was 3.00 and the average family size was 3.32.

In the CDP, the population was spread out, with 33.1% under the age of 18, 6.6% from 18 to 24, 30.6% from 25 to 44, 24.9% from 45 to 64, and 4.8% who were 65 years of age or older.  The median age was 35 years. For every 100 females, there were 102.7 males.  For every 100 females age 18 and over, there were 101.8 males.

The median income for a household in the CDP was $63,250, and the median income for a family was $68,893. Males had a median income of $50,378 versus $30,675 for females. The per capita income for the CDP was $23,485.  About 3.8% of families and 6.9% of the population were below the poverty line, including 6.3% of those under age 18 and 6.5% of those age 65 or over.

References

Census-designated places in Matanuska-Susitna Borough, Alaska
Census-designated places in Alaska
Anchorage metropolitan area